Arrhenius is a lunar impact crater that is located just on the far side of the Moon, near the southwest limb. In this location the vicinity of the crater can be viewed during favorable librations, although it is viewed from on edge. To the south-southeast is the worn crater Blanchard, and De Roy lies further to the west.

The outer wall of Arrhenius has been somewhat worn and eroded due to a history of minor impacts, leaving the rim rounded and low. There is a notch in the rim to the north-northwest, and an outward bulge along the southeast face. A small craterlet lies across the southwestern rim. The inner floor is relatively flat and free of features of interest. The midpoint lacks a central peak.

This crater lies within the Mendel-Rydberg Basin, a 630 km wide impact basin of Nectarian age.

Satellite craters
By convention these features are identified on lunar maps by placing the letter on the side of the crater midpoint that is closest to Arrhenius.

The following craters have been renamed by the IAU.
 Arrhenius P — See Blanchard (crater).

References

External links
 

Impact craters on the Moon